= Slutterhouse =

- Nabil Saliba (left) and Rabih Salloum (right)

Background information
- Origin: Beirut, Lebanon
- Genres: Electronic; pop; rock
- Years active: 2006–2012
- Label: Ringside Production
- Members: Rabih Salloum; Nabil Saliba
- Website: http://www.slutterhouse.com

Slutterhouse was a Lebanese electropop duo based in Beirut and Paris. It was formed in 2006 by singer and songwriter Rabih Salloum and producer Nabil Saliba. The duo itself described its music as a "crossover between underground electronica, mainstream club music, and rock n' roll".

The group's first album, Made in Dance, was released in September 2009 and was met with critical praise by both the international press and audience.

A remix EP of the single "Inside the Station" was released in digital stores worldwide on April 15, 2010.

On November 14, 2011, Slutterhouse released the single, "Stop Me", and their second album, Another Lie, was released on December 30, 2011.

Slutterhouse split up a year later.

== Discography ==
- Made in Dance (2009)
- Another Lie (2011)
