= Made in Dance =

Studio album by Slutterhouse
- Released: September 11, 2009 (Lebanon) (Arab League)
- Recorded: 2006–2009
- Genre: Electronic; pop; rock
- Length: 37:57
- Label: Ringside Production
- Producer: Nabil Saliba

Slutterhouse chronology
Made in Dance (2009)	Inside the Station (2010)

Made in Dance is the first studio album by Lebanese electropop duo Slutterhouse. It was released in the Middle East on September 11, 2009.

== Track listing ==
1. "Illegal Thoughts"
2. "You're So"
3. "Inside the Station"
4. "Flowers"
5. "Drummer Girl"
6. "Made in Dance"
7. "Doe–Eyed"
8. "French Robot Leuve"
9. "Her Face"
10. "Slutterhouse Blues" (bonus track)
